Sandra Thompson (born Chicago) is an American novelist, short story writer, essayist and memoirist.

Life
She was raised in Park Ridge, Illinois.
She graduated from Ohio Wesleyan University, and from Brooklyn College with an MFA, where she studied with Jonathan Baumbach.  She taught at the University of South Florida and at New College of Florida.

She began her career at Magazine Management Co. in New York as editor of True Secrets.
She was an editor, writer and columnist for the St. Petersburg Times. She was nominated for the Pulitzer Prize .

She lives in Tampa, Florida, with her husband Chris Sherman; her  daughter, Alex, lives in New York City.

Awards
 1984 Flannery O'Connor Award for Short Fiction

Works

Memoir
 "Dot, a Life,"

Anthologies

References

External links
"Author's website"

Writers from Chicago
Ohio Wesleyan University alumni
Brooklyn College alumni
University of South Florida faculty
New College of Florida faculty
Year of birth missing (living people)
Living people